The climate of Hungary, is characterized by its position.

Its climate, like its whole geography, is as the result of environmental changes during the Holocene Era.

Hungary's climate is the result of the interaction of two major climate systems: the continental climate and the oceanic climate. The influence of both these systems are felt across the country at different times, which means that the weather is very changeable. Hungary has a temperate seasonal climate.

Hungary was ranked sixth in an environmental protection index by GW/CAN.

Influencing factors
The two most important factors influencing the climate of Hungary are its distance from the Atlantic and the prevailing westerly winds. The continental character of the Hungarian climate is far from being as extreme as in Eastern Europe. The degree of continentality can be illustrated by the following example: if the Atlantic coast is taken as zero and Verkhoyansk in Siberia as 100, then Sopron (Western Hungary), Putnok (Northern Hungary) and Tótkomlós (South-Eastern Hungary), would be 27.3, 30.4 and 34, respectively. The depressions of the temperate zone follow in the path of the westerly winds and bring heavy rains to the country.

The country's situation within the geographical region of the Carpathian Basin is also important. The surrounding mountain ranges modify the impact of winds and other climatic forces progressing towards the country.

Hungary's climate is influenced by two more or less permanent action centers of the temperate zone, the Icelandic Low and the Azores High. Depressions originating from the Iceland zone travel across the country bringing cool weather and rain. When the Azores high gains the ascendancy, the weather is bright and dry, in winter and summer alike. Beside the permanent ones there is an important seasonal action center too, the Siberian High, which exerts its influence from time to time in winter, when the cold air masses over Siberia and Eastern Europe are driven across the Carpathian mountains and settle for some time over the Carpathian Basin.

Sunshine
From north to south, Hungary differs by only about 3 degrees of latitude. The seasonal variance in the angle of incidence of the Sun's rays is, therefore, about 3°.

The average hours of sunshine vary between 1,700 and 2,100 a year (at Sopron 1,700 hours, in Szeged 2,068 hours). The maxima at both are in July.

The annual average of completely overcast days varies between 70 and 190. The actual hours of sunshine – that is, any sunshine on a day – reaches almost the half of that possible – 46%. (London, by comparison, has about 33 percent a year).

Temperature
Even in Hungary, the temperature is warmer than, for example, neighboring Austria, because of the south flow over the Alps of the Gulf Stream. Towards the east, this gradually diminishes.

The difference between the north and the south is only , because of the relatively small distance between south and north. For instance, the mean temperature in Southern England, Massif Central in France and Switzerland is the same, but in Hungary there are much greater extremes from summer to winter.

Agronomy
The heat total during Hungary's growing season rises above  over much of the country, which is very favorable to agriculture in Hungary. But, frosts in May can represent a serious hazard to crops.

Budapest lies on the boundary between hardiness zones 6 and 7.

Wind
The wind exerts a strong influence on the other climatic elements by its velocity, direction and ability to mobilize the air masses. At an altitude independent of relief effect, about 4,000 m, westerly currents predominate over the country. Closer to the surface, over the greater part of the country, north-westerly winds predominate, but east of the Tisza river northerly winds prevail. As regards wind velocity, the mean annual value varies between 1,5 and 2,5 on the Beaufort scale (2 and 3" 5 m/s) over the whole country. The changes of atmospheric pressure are not very significant.

Precipitation
The driest parts of the country are in the east, where for example in the Hortobágy the annual precipitation remains below .

As is characteristic of the continental climate, the most precipitation occurs in late spring and early summer. In the south-western region a second maximum occurs during October under influences of the Mediterranean climate.

The number of rainy days is over 100 in the south-western borderland, as well as in the area of the Mátra and Bükk mountains; but less than 80 along the middle section of the Tisza . Low precipitation, heat, and strong evaporation make the Great Hungarian Plain very dusty in summer.

Thunderstorms and gales are common, particularly in the summer months. In winter, from the end of November to the beginning of March, precipitation falls partly in the form of snow. The snow cover varies considerably. The thinnest snow cover is found in the eastern region of the Great Plain (with the annual average being ). Often winter corn remains open to the elements, when farmers do not expect any hard frost.

Humidity
In Hungary the air humidity is much higher in summer than in winter. The highest relative water vapor content (over 75%) is found in the western borderland.

Terrain
The surface of the country and the hydrology of Hungary also affects the climate. Their general influence on the macroclimate is negligible, but they have an effect on the meso- and microclimates. A good example is the microclimate of the surroundings of the great lakes, especially that of the Lake Balaton. But bare sandy surfaces, hills (of calcium carbonate such as dolomite) such as the hills surrounding Buda and even the kind of vegetation also have an influence on the meso- and microclimates.

The relief energy of Hungary, that is, the differences in altitude in the country (in other words its hydroelectric potential) is relatively small, but the  difference in altitude between the Great Hungarian Plain and the shallow northern mountain ranges is enough to produce clear differences in the climates of the two areas.

Examples

Sources

 

 
Hungary